Best of the Anti-Nowhere League is the first compilation album by English punk rock band the Anti-Nowhere League. This album contains the full 12" of Out on the Waterfront and four tracks that were absent from the Live in Yugoslavia album.

Track listing
Streets of London
I Hate People
We Are the League
Let's Break the law
 Animal
Woman
Rocker
For You
Ballad of JJ Decay
Out on the Wasteland
We Will Survive
Queen and Country
On the Waterfront
Let the Country Feed You (Live)
Going Down (Live)
Snowman (Live)
So What (Live)

References

Anti-Nowhere League albums
1992 greatest hits albums